The Clans Have United is Skiltron's first studio album, released in 2006.

The album was recorded between April and October 2005, in the La Nave de Osberg studios in Buenos Aires.  it was released in March 2006.  Javier Yuchechen was the sessionist vocalist, and local Celtic musicians also participated.

At the end of 2006, The Clans Have United  was named best album of the year on the radio show Tiempos Violentos.

Track listing

External links
 Skiltron Official Website

2006 albums
Skiltron albums